Girardet is a surname. Articles include:

 Edward Girardet (born 1951), American journalist
 Frédy Girardet (born 1936), Swiss chef
 Herbert Girardet (born 1943), German-born British environmentalist and author
 Raoul Girardet (1917-2013), French historian
 Véronique Girardet (born 1965), French sport shooter
 The Girardet family of artists
 Abraham Girardet (1764-1823), Swiss engraver
 Alexandre Girardet (1767–1836), Swiss engraver
 Abraham Louis Girardet (1772-1821), Swiss engraver
 Charles Samuel Girardet (1780-1863), Swiss engraver and lithographer
 Karl Girardet (1813-1871), Swiss-French engraver
 Edouard Girardet (1819–1880), Swiss-French engraver and painter 
 Henri Girardet (1848–1917), Swiss-French lithographer and painter
 Paul Girardet (1821–1893), Swiss-French engraver
 Eugène Girardet (1853-1907), French painter
 Jules Girardet (1856-1938), French painter
 Léon Girardet (1856-1895), French painter, Jules' twin brother
 Paul Armand Girardet, French painter and engraver.
 Théodore Girardet (1861-1935), French engraver
 Berthe Girardet (1861-1948), French sculptor, Paul Armand's wife